Colonel Sir Gordon William Nottage Palmer  (18 July 1918 – 3 July 1989) was Lord Lieutenant of Berkshire from 1978 to 1989, High Sheriff of Berkshire, 1965, and Chairman of Huntley and Palmer Foods, Reading, Berkshire.

He was the younger son of Ernest Palmer, 2nd Baron Palmer by his American wife Marguerite McKinley, daughter of William McKinley Osborne, United States Army General. He was educated at Eton College and Christ Church, Oxford.

Military service
He was commissioned into the Royal Artillery and by the end of the Second World War he was a Lieutenant-Colonel. After the war he served in the Territorial Army and was promoted to Colonel in 1956.

Family
Colonel Palmer married, May 6, 1950, in Duns, Scottish Borders, Lorna Eveline Hope, daughter of Charles William Hugh Bailie, of Manderston, Berwickshire, by which marriage the Palmer family came into possession of Manderston. At the time of his marriage he was resident at 'Fernhurst' at Pinkneys Green in Berkshire. Later, he lived at Foudry House in Stratfield Mortimer.

They had two sons:
Adrian Palmer, 4th Baron Palmer (b. 1951)
 Hon. Mark Palmer (b. 1954)

References

1918 births
1989 deaths
People educated at Eton College
Alumni of Christ Church, Oxford
Lord-Lieutenants of Berkshire
High Sheriffs of Berkshire
Knights Commander of the Royal Victorian Order
Officers of the Order of the British Empire
Gordon
Royal Artillery officers
People from Maidenhead
People from West Berkshire District
Younger sons of barons
British Army personnel of World War II